The third and final season of the American political drama series Designated Survivor was ordered on September 5, 2018. Netflix reached a deal with Entertainment One to pick up the series after its cancellation from ABC. The third season, consisting of 10 episodes, premiered exclusively on Netflix on June 7, 2019.

Premise
United States President Kirkman faces the political reality of campaigning as well as the tribulations of political advertising tactics used by the opposition. The season follows the President's fight to secure the interest of the public opinion and ultimately, the chances of his administration being elected for another term.

Cast and characters

Main
 Kiefer Sutherland as President Thomas "Tom" Kirkman
 Adan Canto as National Security Advisor and  later Vice President-elect Aaron Shore
 Italia Ricci as White House Special Advisor and campaign spokesperson Emily Rhodes
 Kal Penn as White House Press Secretary and  White House Communications Director Seth Wright
 Maggie Q as Central Intelligence Agency (CIA) Case Officer Hannah Wells

Recurring 
 Anthony Edwards as White House Chief of Staff Mars Harper
 Julie White as Kirkman's campaign manager Lorraine Zimmer
 Elena Tovar as White House Director of Social Innovation Isabel Pardo
 Lauren Holly as Lynn Harper Mars' wife
 Benjamin Charles Watson as White House Digital Officer Dontae Evans
 Jamie Clayton as Sasha Booker Kirkman's transgender sister in law 
 Mckenna Grace as Penelope "Penny" Kirkman
Chukwudi Iwuji as Dr. Eli Mays
 Geoff Pierson as Republican Presidential nominee Cornelius Moss
 Eltony Williams as Agent Troy Baye
 Jennifer Wigmore as CIA Deputy Director Dianne Lewis
 Wendy Lyon as Carrie Rhodes, Emily's mother

Guest 
 Tim Busfield as Dr. Adam Louden
 Aunjanue Ellis as Vice President Ellenor Darby
 Jake Foy as Felix
 Rose Tuong as Kimiko
 Kent Sheridan as Senator Carlin
 Thomas Olajide as Mike Carter
 Aaron Ashmore as Phil Brunton
 James Cade as Myles Lee
 Percy Harris as Reggie Wood
 Karen Parker as Cheryl Jones
 Aniko Kaszas as Elizabeth Turner
 Erik Knudsen as Davis Marlowe
 Al Sapienza as General Nathan Kellogg

Episodes

Production

Development
On May 11, 2018, ABC canceled the series after two seasons due to a high turnover of showrunners and declining ratings. Shortly after, eOne announced they were in "active discussions" with other networks to revive the show, including Netflix, which streams the series internationally. On September 5, 2018, it was confirmed that Netflix had picked up the series for a third season of 10 episodes, to be released in 2019. Neal Baer served as the series showrunner, the fifth person to do so. On April 24, 2019, it was announced that the third season would premiere on Netflix on June 7, 2019.

The first two seasons were produced by ABC Studios, The Mark Gordon Company, and eOne, with filming in Toronto, Ontario. For the third season, it was announced that ABC Studios would not be involved, with eOne (which had fully acquired the Mark Gordon Company) being the sole production company for the series.

Casting
After the third season renewal announcement, the producers confirmed that Kiefer Sutherland, Adan Canto, Italia Ricci, Kal Penn and Maggie Q would return as series regulars. On October 18, 2018, casting of Anthony Edwards, Julie White and Elena Tovar in the recurring roles of Mars Harper, Lorraine Zimmer and Isabel Pardo respectively were announced. On November 15, 2018, Lauren Holly and Benjamin Watson were cast in recurring roles as Lynn Harper and Dontae Evans, respectively.

Filming

Filming for the third season started in October 2018 and ended in February 2019.

References

External links 
 
 

2019 American television seasons
season 3